This is a list of Finnish municipalities without passenger rail services. The list includes all municipalities down to those with approximately 4,000 in population.

See also
List of Finnish municipalities by population
VR Group
Rail transport in Finland

References

Passenger rail transport in Finland
Municipalities of Finland
Municipalities without scheduled railway services
Municipalities without scheduled railway services